Jesús Alberto Dátolo (born 19 May 1984) is an Argentine professional footballer who playeds as a midfielder for Tristán Suárez.

Club career
Dátolo started his career in 2000 at Cañuelas in Primera C Metropolitana, Argentina's fourth division. In 2002, he signed for Primera División club, Banfield and broke into the first team squad in 2005. He played with his future Boca Juniors colleagues; Rodrigo Palacio and Gabriel Paletta. Dátolo moved to Boca Juniors during the mid-year transfer period of 2006. Boca bought 50% of his pass, and 100% of the sports rights.

He was a regular in the Boca starting line-up since the 2007 Apertura, where his performances gradually improved. He was a part of the Boca Juniors team that won the 2007 Copa Libertadores. In the 2008 Copa Libertadores, Datolo scored in Boca's 3–0 win against Venezuela's Maracaibo, as Boca progressed to the knock-out stages after being required to win by at least three goals. Datolo would again score in Boca's 2–1 first-leg win against Brazil's Cruzeiro at the Round of 16 stage. Boca reached the semi-final stage of the Copa Libertadores where which they were eliminated by Brazil's Fluminense. Boca Juniors went on to win the 2008 Torneo Apertura.

After the Torneo de Verano of January 2009 Dátolo would go on to sign for Italian Serie A club, Napoli. On 16 January 2010, it was announced that Napoli's 25-year-old midfielder will play on loan for Olympiakos F.C. until the end of the season. Datolo had asked Napoli for a transfer in order to gain regular game time to secure a place in Argentina's team at the 2010 FIFA World Cup. Greek club Olympiacos had beaten off a deal with Datolo ahead of Paris Saint-Germain F.C., who were chasing his signature as well.

Dátolo played for Internacional, after arriving from RCD Espanyol. On 9 August 2013, he signed with Atlético Mineiro. After the end of his contract, Dátolo signed with Vitória in January 2017. He scored his first two goals on 15 February, including one direct from a corner.

Career statistics

International career
Dátolo made his international debut for Argentina in a friendly match against Russia in Moscow on 12 August 2009; he scored his first goal after just 20 seconds on the pitch. His first competitive goal came in a 3–1 loss against Brazil with a 30-yard shot.

International goals

Honours
Boca Juniors
Recopa Sudamericana: 2006, 2008
Copa Libertadores: 2007
Argentine Primera División: Apertura 2008

Internacional
Campeonato Gaúcho: 2012, 2013

Atlético Mineiro
Recopa Sudamericana: 2014
Copa do Brasil: 2014
Campeonato Mineiro: 2015

References

External links

1984 births
Living people
People from Ezeiza Partido
Argentine footballers
Association football midfielders
Argentine Primera División players
Cañuelas footballers
Club Atlético Banfield footballers
Boca Juniors footballers
Serie A players
S.S.C. Napoli players
Super League Greece players
Olympiacos F.C. players
La Liga players
RCD Espanyol footballers
Campeonato Brasileiro Série A players
Sport Club Internacional players
Clube Atlético Mineiro players
Esporte Clube Vitória players
Argentina international footballers
Argentine expatriate footballers
Expatriate footballers in Brazil
Expatriate footballers in Italy
Expatriate footballers in Greece
Expatriate footballers in Spain
Argentine expatriate sportspeople in Brazil
Argentine expatriate sportspeople in Spain
Sportspeople from Buenos Aires Province
Argentine people of Italian descent